Tudor and Cashel is a township in the Canadian province of Ontario, located in Hastings County.

The township consists of two non-contiguous portions, separated by Limerick township and the northernmost portion of Tweed.The municipality is mostly rural.

History
Tudor Township was created circa 1865. Cashel Township was created circa 1869. Tudor and Cashel Townships were administered as one in 1897.

Limerick Township and Wollaston Township petitioned unsuccessfully for separation from Tudor Township in 1868. Wollaston Township was eventually formed circa 1880. Limerick Township was eventually formed in 1887 between today's Tudor and Cashel Townships. Geologically Limerick Township and Tudor Township are very similar, with valuable mineral resources.

After the separation of old Limerick Township, the townships of Tudor and Cashel were geographically separated since Limerick abutted along a corner of old Grimsthorpe Township (which was later amalgamated into the Municipality of Tweed).

Communities

 Gilmour 
 Glanmire , ghost town
 Gunter 
 Millbridge , ghost town
 Millbridge Station , ghost town

Demographics 

Mother tongue:
 English as first language: 83.8%
 French as first language: 8.1%
 English and French as first language: 0%
 Other as first language: 8.1%

See also
List of townships in Ontario

References

External links 

Township municipalities in Ontario
Lower-tier municipalities in Ontario
Municipalities in Hastings County